Jesper Pedersen may refer to:

 Jesper Pedersen (footballer, born 1961), Danish football player and manager
 Jesper Bøge Pedersen (born 1990), Danish footballer
 Jesper Pedersen (alpine skier) (born 1999), Norwegian para-alpine skier